John Leahy (15 July 1854 – 20 January 1909) was a newspaper proprietor and member of the Queensland Legislative Assembly.

Leahy was born at Schull, Cork, to Patrick Leahy, farmer, and his wife Mary (née Coghlan). After receiving his education he moved to Queensland where he was said to have worked as a rural labourer before becoming postmaster at Windorah then settling in Thargomindah. It was here that Leahy held a partnership in a cordial factory and, with his brother Patrick, became part-owner of the Thargomindah Herald. From 1886 until 1889 he was also the proprietor of the Royal Hotel which was located in the main street of the town.

Political career
Leahy was the member for Bulloo from 1893 until his death in 1909. He was minister for Railways and Public Works from 1901 to 1903 and Speaker of the Queensland Legislative Assembly from 1907 to 1909.

Personal life
On the 11 February 1886, Leahy married Annie Colbert at Thargomindah and together had one son and six daughters.

Leahy died in Brisbane in 1909. His funeral moved from his home in New Farm to the Toowong Cemetery.

References

1854 births
1909 deaths
Members of the Queensland Legislative Assembly
Speakers of the Queensland Legislative Assembly
Irish emigrants to colonial Australia
Burials at Toowong Cemetery
19th-century Australian politicians